Edmund Poku is a Ghanaian entrepreneur. He is the CEO of Niche Cocoa Company Limited, a cocoa company he founded in 2007.

Early life and education 
Poku holds a B.S. in Industrial Engineering from the Columbia University and a B.A. in Liberal Arts from Bowdoin College. Poku also has an MBA from the Columbia Business School and a master's degree in Engineering Management from Dartmouth College.

Career 
Poku served as a Manager of Strategic Business Development at Home Depot immediately after completing his MBA. Thereafter he worked as an investment banker with Goldman Sachs before deciding to return home to Ghana.

Poku originally came up with the idea for Niche Cocoa while working on his MBA thesis. Following his return to Ghana, he succeeded in securing financing for his project and started a company known as Commodities Processing Industry Limited (CPI) in 2007. In 2011, CPI changed its name to Niche Cocoa.

Awards 
Poku was awarded Cocoa Entrepreneur of the year at the 2019 Ghana Cocoa Awards.

See also 
 Niche Cocoa Company Limited
 Omanhene Cocoa Bean Company

References 

Year of birth missing (living people)
Living people
Ghanaian businesspeople
Ghanaian chief executives
Ghanaian business executives